Rebati Das was an Indian National Congress politician from the state of Assam. She was a former Member of Assam Legislative Assembly for Jalukbari. She was the mother of finance minister Ajanta Neog and mother in law of ex-minister Nagen Neog.

Political career 
Das was the Indian National Congress candidate for Jalukbari in the 1972 Assam Legislative Assembly election. She received 8809 votes, 38.35% of the total vote. She defeated her nearest independent opponent by 3045 votes. She sought reelection in the 1978 Assam Legislative Assembly election. She received 3550 votes, 8.67% of the total vote. She came third in the election and was succeeded by Janata Party candidate Lakshyadhar Choudhury.

References 

Assam MLAs 1972–1978
Year of birth missing
Place of birth missing
Year of death missing
Place of death missing
Indian National Congress politicians from Assam